Białołęka may refer to the following places in Poland:
Białołęka, a district of Warsaw
Białołęka, a village in Gmina Pęcław, Głogów County, in Lower Silesian Voivodeship (SW Poland)